Lord Morley may refer to:

Baron Morley, a title in the Peerage of England in use from 1295 until 1697
John Morley, 1st Viscount Morley of Blackburn (1838–1923), British statesman and journalist